Curello Ciccaro (died 1429) was a Roman Catholic prelate who served as Bishop of Lecce (1419–1429).

Biography
According to David M. Cheney, on 19 December 1419, Curello Ciccaro was appointed by Pope Martin V as Bishop of Lecce. According to Konrad Eubel, Ciccaro was appointed Bishop of Lecce by Antipope John XXIII on 19 December 1412.

He served as Bishop of Lecce until his death in 1429.

References

External links and additional sources
 (for Chronology of Bishops) 
 (for Chronology of Bishops) 

15th-century Italian Roman Catholic bishops
1429 deaths
Bishops appointed by Pope Martin V